Joseph Clifford Hendrix (May 25, 1853 – November 9, 1904) was an American educator and politician who served one term as a U.S. Representative from New York from 1893 to 1895.

Biography 
Born in Fayette, Missouri, Hendrix attended private schools and Central College at Fayette and Cornell University, Ithaca, New York from 1870 to 1873.

He moved to New York City in 1873 and worked for the New York Sun.
He was appointed a member of the Board of Education of Brooklyn in 1882.
He was an unsuccessful Democratic candidate for mayor of Brooklyn in 1883.
He was appointed trustee of the New York and Brooklyn Bridge in 1884.

Hendrix was elected secretary of the board of bridge trustees in 1885.
He was appointed postmaster of Brooklyn by President Cleveland in 1886 and served until July 1, 1890.

Hendrix was elected president of the board of education of Brooklyn in 1887.
He served as president of the Kings County Trust Co. in 1889–1893.
He served as president of the National Union Bank of New York City in 1893–1900.

Congress 
Hendrix was elected as a Democrat to the Fifty-third Congress (March 4, 1893 – March 3, 1895).
He was not a candidate for renomination in 1894.

Later career and death 
He served as president of the National Bank of Commerce in 1900.
Trustee of the Brooklyn Institute of Arts and Sciences.
Trustee of Cornell University.
He died in Brooklyn, New York, November 9, 1904.
He was interred in Green-Wood Cemetery.

Sources

External links

 

1853 births
1904 deaths
Burials at Green-Wood Cemetery
Cornell University alumni
Democratic Party members of the United States House of Representatives from New York (state)
Central Methodist University alumni
School board members in New York (state)
19th-century American politicians
People from Fayette, Missouri